The Bond Between is a 1917 American silent drama film directed by Donald Crisp and written by George Beban. The film stars George Beban, John Burton, Nigel De Brulier, Paul Weigel, Colin Chase, and Eugene Pallette. The film was released on April 2, 1917, by Paramount Pictures.

Plot

Cast

References

External links

1917 films
1910s English-language films
Silent American drama films
1917 drama films
Paramount Pictures films
Films directed by Donald Crisp
American black-and-white films
American silent feature films
1910s American films